Freedom (Azadlıq) was an electoral alliance of the Musavat (Müsavat Partiyası), the Azerbaijan Popular Front Party (Azərbaycan Xalq Cəbhəsi Partiyası) and the Azerbaijan Democratic Party (Azərbaycan Demokrat Partiyası).

It won at the last elections, 6 November 2005, only 7 out of 125 seats.

Defunct political parties in Azerbaijan
Defunct political party alliances in Asia
Defunct political party alliances in Europe
Political party alliances in Azerbaijan